HNLMS Friesland was a  protected cruiser of the Royal Netherlands Navy.

Design
Two  single turret guns provided the ship's main armament, and these were augmented by six single  guns and four  single guns. The ship had a complement of 324 men.

Service history
The ship was built at the Nederlandsche Stoomboot Maatschappij in Rotterdam and launched on 4 November 1896. The ship was commissioned on 16 January 1898.

On 28 April 1899 Friesland was sent to Curaçao to safeguard Dutch neutrality because of war in the region. Later that year the ship was sent to the Dutch East Indies. Because of the Second Boer War the ship was sent from Tanjung Priok on 24 October 1899 to Lourenço Marques to protect Dutch citizens and interests in the region. On 23 August 1900 Friesland returned to the Dutch East Indies.

In 1902 the ship was sent to Colombo to pick up 10 Dutch volunteers who fought in the Boer war and were taken prisoner by the British and interned on Ceylon. This happened on the request of the local Dutch consul.  On 4 July 1904 Friesland left for the Netherlands with the volunteers on board.

On 12 July 1906 the ship left the port of Den Helder for practice on the North Sea and Arctic Ocean. During the trip the ship visited the ports of Tromsø, Bergen and Kristiania. Close to Svalbard the ship assisted the grounded French passenger ship Ile de France by pulling it loose. Friesland returned to port on 27 August.

Friesland guarded the entry to Maracaibo.

On 17 September 1910 the ship was present for the state visit of the Belgian king Albert I and his wife to the Netherlands. During this visit the couple visited the IJ in Amsterdam where Jacob van Heemskerck, Friesland,  and other Dutch warships were present and fired saluting shots. The pair was given a tour of  Jacob van Heemskerck.

The ship was decommissioned in 1913.

Notes

References
Staatsbegrooting voor het dienstjaar 1903 (2. VI. 5.)

Holland-class cruisers
1896 ships